Troy Vandem Flavell (born 4 November 1976 in Auckland, New Zealand) is a former New Zealand rugby union player. Flavell won 22 caps for New Zealand, and mainly played lock. He is known for his power in the scrum. He attended Massey High School alongside Ron Cribb and both played for Massey Rugby Club.

Career 

In October 2005, Flavell returned to New Zealand after a season with Japanese club Toyota Verblitz. In his last game for Toyota Verblitz in the 43rd Japan Championships on 12 February 2006 he was part of a team which lost to the top student side, Waseda University. This was the first time that a Top League team had lost to a university team.
He opted for a switch to the Auckland Rugby Union instead of joining his former union North Harbour (based in the northern part of the Auckland Region). He was contracted to Auckland for two seasons.

Flavell regained his All Black place in 2006 with two tests against Ireland before being injured for the rest of the season.

He was named captain of the Blues for the 2007 Super 14 season and was considered the outstanding forward of the Super 14, subsequently regaining his All Black Jersey. He played in the first five tests of the 2007 season. However he was left out of the All Black 2007 Rugby World Cup squad, being replaced by Sione Lauaki. Many people, including Zinzan Brooke considered this to be a bad decision.

In May 2008, Flavell signed to play with the Japanese club Mitsubishi Sagamihara DynaBoars on a two-year contract, starting from the conclusion of the 2008 Super 14 season.

In August 2010, Flavell signed for Bayonne in the French Top 14.

Flavell has played 22 tests for New Zealand, 79 Super Rugby games for the Auckland Blues and 59 games for North Harbour. He has also played for the New Zealand Māori.

In 2020, he completed season 1 of Match Fit.

References

External links
Blues profile

Waseda gives Toyota All-Japan lesson, Daily Yomiuri, 14 February 2006

1976 births
Living people
Māori All Blacks players
New Zealand international rugby union players
North Harbour rugby union players
New Zealand rugby union players
Blues (Super Rugby) players
Rugby union locks
Expatriate rugby union players in Japan
People educated at Massey High School
Ponsonby RFC players
Toyota Verblitz players
Mitsubishi Sagamihara DynaBoars players
Aviron Bayonnais players
New Zealand expatriate rugby union players
New Zealand expatriate sportspeople in Japan
New Zealand expatriate sportspeople in France
Expatriate rugby union players in France
Rugby union players from Auckland